Bodfari is a village and community in Denbighshire, Wales. Until the local government reorganisation of 1974, Bodfari was in the historic county of Flintshire.

The ancient parish of Bodfari comprised the townships of Bodfari, which was in historic Flintshire, and Aberwheeler, in historic Denbighshire.

Location 
Bodfari is located at the approximate grid reference SJ093701. The village lies on the A541 road at the point where the road passes through a gap in the Clwydian Hills, the gap being part of the valley of the River Wheeler (Welsh: Afon Chwiler).

The Offa's Dyke National Trail passes through the village, and for walkers completing the trail south to north, Bodfari is usually the final overnight stop on the 177-mile route. The Clwydian Way long-distance path also passes the village.

The parish church
Bodfari was the home of Deifer the recluse, who was visited by Saint Winefrid (Welsh: Gwenfrewy) according to Robert of Shrewsbury. Winifred is said to have left Holywell and visited him before being sent on to Henllan. His commemoration day is given in a few calendars as March 8.

Notable residents 
 Phillida Nicholson (1924 - 2021) artist and Land Girl.
 Sian Adey-Jones (born 1957) a former beauty queen and glamour model.

Transport

References

External links 

www.geograph.co.uk : photos of Bodfari and surrounding area